The women's 400 metres competition of the athletics events at the 2019 Pan American Games will take place between the 7 and 8 of August at the 2019 Pan American Games Athletics Stadium. The defending Pan American Games champion is Kendall Baisden from the United States.

Summary
Right out of the blocks, Shericka Jackson was moving ahead of the stagger.  Just inside of her, Paola Morán was trying to key off of her.  Down the backstretch the center lanes of the track, including Courtney Okolo were moving ahead.  The separation continued all the way to the finish.

Records
Prior to this competition, the existing world and Pan American Games records were as follows:

Schedule

Results
All times shown are in seconds.

Semifinal
Qualification: First 3 in each heat (Q) and next 2 fastest (q) qualified for the final. The results were as follows:

Final
The results were as follows:

References

Athletics at the 2019 Pan American Games
2019